George William Freeman (born 12 July 1967) is a British Conservative Party politician serving as Minister of State for Science, Research and Innovation since October 2022. He has served as the member of Parliament (MP) for Mid Norfolk since 2010. He served as Parliamentary Under-Secretary of State for Science, Research and Innovation from September 2021 until his resignation in July 2022.

Early life
Freeman was born on 12 July 1967 to jockey Arthur Freeman and Joanna Stockbridge. His parents divorced soon after he was born, and he had no contact with his father until he reached adulthood, growing up as a ward of court. Freeman would later buy at auction the trophy his father received as winner of the 1958 Grand National.

He counts 19th-century Prime Minister William Ewart Gladstone as his great-great-great-uncle, and Mabel Philipson as his great-aunt. He was educated at Radley College and Girton College, Cambridge, graduating with a Geography degree in 1989.

After university, Freeman worked in Westminster as a lobbyist for the National Farmers' Union. Before entering Parliament, he had a career in biomedical venture capital.

Political career
Freeman stood unsuccessfully in Stevenage at the 2005 general election. He was subsequently added to the Conservative A-List, and was selected for Mid Norfolk in October 2006.

Freeman was elected at the 2010 general election as MP for Mid Norfolk. The previous incumbent, Keith Simpson, contested the neighbouring Broadland constituency instead.

The Independent highlighted Freeman as one of a small number of MPs who claimed Parliamentary expenses for rent in London despite owning and letting out property in the city.

Shortly after entering Parliament, Freeman was elected Chair of the All Party Group on Science and Technology in Agriculture. He was appointed Parliamentary Private Secretary to the Minister for Climate Change, Greg Barker, in the Coalition Government's first tranche of appointments. In July 2011, Freeman was appointed Government Life Science Advisor.

At a 2011 Boxing Day hunt, he called for a review of the ban on hunting with dogs, calling it "class war against the countryside". In the same year, he opposed holding a referendum on the UK's membership of the European Union. In 2013, Freeman opposed the legalisation of same-sex marriage and supported military intervention in Syria.

After a number of accidents on the A47 road in his constituency, Freeman campaigned for investment in safety. The road was included in a programme of investment announced in December 2014.

In 2014, he was appointed Parliamentary Under-Secretary of State for Life Sciences at the Department of Health and the Department for Business, Innovation and Skills. The role had not previously existed in any country. Freeman was nicknamed "High Tech Hezza", after Michael Heseltine whose former office he occupied while minister. During this role, Freeman was criticised by Labour opponents for describing use of prosecutions to enforce the minimum wage as "the politics of envy". In 2015, he asked the Medicines and Healthcare products Regulatory Agency to establish an enquiry into disabilities caused by hormone pregnancy tests.

Freeman is a co-founder of the 2020 Group of Conservative MPs, which he described as the "radical progressive centre ground" of the Conservative Party.

In 2017, Freeman criticised a tribunal ruling that people with extreme anxiety who struggle to leave the house should have the same legal status as the partially sighted, saying that the former were not "really disabled". After criticism from opposition MPs, disability charity Scope, and the Equality and Human Rights Commission, he said that he regretted if his comment "inadvertently caused any offence which was not intended", and that he did not "need any lectures on the damage anxiety does" after childhood experience of anxiety and depression.

Freeman chaired the Prime Minister's Policy Board until his resignation in November 2017. He warned the party not to be defined by "nostalgia, hard Brexit, public sector austerity and lazy privilege". In September 2018, he called for Prime Minister Theresa May's resignation once a deal on the UK's departure from the European Union was secured through Parliament. He said he would stand to be her successor if supported by his party, before ruling out the possibility shortly afterward.

Freeman founded The Big Tent Ideas Festival in 2017, in an attempt to connect the Conservative party with younger people following Jeremy Corbyn's appearance at Glastonbury Festival that summer. He called the event a "Tory Glastonbury". In 2018, he changed the festival to be "non-party political so that MPs, peers and others from the centre left can also get involved", and claimed that “for a generation under 40 the traditional party conference is as dead as a dodo”.

In 2018 Freeman set up The Bridge of Hope, a charity in memory of his father, in an attempt to establish "a mechanism for taking those who had taken a fall in life, whether from injury, disability, mental illness, addiction, crime, debt, homelessness and giving them a second chance".

At a party conference fringe meeting in 2018, Freeman described "his horror" being given £4.2 billion by the Treasury to computerise the NHS which was then still relying on paper records. He had not been invited to any of the meetings about the project, authorised by George Osborne and Jeremy Hunt, and had received no clear directions on how it was to be spent.

On 26 July 2019, at the beginning of the first Johnson ministry, Freeman was appointed Minister of State at the Department for Transport. He left government at the cabinet reshuffle in February 2020.

In February 2021, Freeman apologised for breaking the Advisory Committee on Business Appointments' financial conflict-of-interest rules after he took paid work from Aerosol Shield, a company trying to sell PPE to the NHS during the COVID-19 pandemic. 

On 17 September 2021, Freeman returned to government as Parliamentary Under-Secretary of State for Science, Research and Innovation at the Department for Business, Energy and Industrial Strategy, during the second cabinet reshuffle of the second Johnson ministry. He resigned from this position on 7 July 2022 as part of the July 2022 United Kingdom government crisis.

During the October 2022 Conservative Party leadership election, Freeman initially supported Penny Mordaunt, but later said that "given the urgent need for Conservative stability and unity this week, I’m urging her to join and back Rishi Sunak today".

On 26 October 2022, at the beginning of the Sunak ministry, Freeman was reappointed Minister of State for Science, Research and Innovation, replacing Nus Ghani.

Freeman was a member of the of 2020 Conservatives group, and is on the advisory board of Bright Blue, a liberal conservative think tank, as well as think tanks Radix and Reform.

Personal life
Freeman was married to Eleanor from 1996 to 2016, and has two children.

In 2020 Freeman married theatre director Fiona Laird.

Notes

References

External links
 Official website

|-

|-

1967 births
Living people
Alumni of Girton College, Cambridge
Conservative Party (UK) MPs for English constituencies
People educated at Radley College
UK MPs 2010–2015
UK MPs 2015–2017
UK MPs 2017–2019
UK MPs 2019–present